Heritage Trust for the North West / Heritage Trust North West is a registered Building Preservation Trust, established in 1978 as a charity and company.

Formerly known as the Lancashire Heritage Trust, it has rescued and restored many buildings of architectural interest at risk in Lancashire. In 1996 Lancashire Heritage Trust merged with the North West Buildings Preservation Trust which had similar aims and enlarged its remit to cover the North West of England, a requirement of the Charity Commission. Subsequently, the trust has developed projects in Manchester, Liverpool and Cumbria.

The aim of the trust is to restore and find new and appropriate uses for historic buildings and encourage good design and craftsmanship. It has retained some of the buildings it has restored to provide funding for further projects. Others are open to the public forming a network of historic places.

Up to October 2006 the trust's headquarters were in Barrowford, a building which is now the Pendle Heritage Centre, founded in 1977, and one of the trust's flagship projects. The heritage centre attracts over 100,000 visitors a year.  Since October 2006 the trust's headquarters are at Higherford Mill, a Grade II listed building owned by the trust and restored as a centre for creative industries.

Organisational Structure 
The Trust compromises of seven trustees which is chaired by John Turner. In 2021 the trust appointed a new CEO, Elizabeth Moss.

Buildings within the Trust

The trust is involved with projects and buildings including:

Visitor Centres
The trust has the following visitor centres:

Associated Groups
The trust has involvement with many groups, including:
 Architectural Heritage Fund (AHF)
 English Heritage
 European Regional Development Fund
 Friends of Bank Hall
 Friends of Lytham Hall
 Heritage Lottery Fund
 Lancashire County Council (LCC)
 Lancashire Environmental Fund
 North West Regional Development Agency
 Pendle Borough Council
 Pendle Partnership
 The Prince's Regeneration Trust

Exhibitions

References

External links
 CharitiesDirect.com
 Heritage Trust Projects Leaflet
 Welsh Presbyterian Church
 Heritage Trust for the North West

North West England
Heritage organisations in England
Charities based in Lancashire